Branimir Lokner, music editor and reviewer from Belgrade, Serbia. 
He worked as a music critic beginning in 1980, and has released two books about critical views oriented to  former Yugoslavian artists. He writes about music, radio and TV programs/editions.He appeared as one of many supoters of Grand Production label. His criticism can be found on many webzines/sites/portals.

Works
Kritičko pakovanje, Active Time, 199?, 
Helikopter na glavi: istorija rokenrola u Pančevu: 1962-2004, Tim za komunikaciju, 2005, 
Od Čivija do Goblina: ilustrovana rock enciklopedija Šapca: (1963.-1999.-2006.), Kulturni centar, 2006,

References

External links
Author's blog

Living people
Serbian journalists
Year of birth missing (living people)